Josh Boyer (born January 21, 1977) is an American football coach. Boyer previously coached with the New England Patriots and multiple college football teams.

Coaching career

College
After graduating from Muskingum College,  where he played football as a wide receiver and defensive back, he began his coaching career in 2000 as a graduate assistant at King's College, Pennsylvania, and then served in the same capacity at the University of Dayton in 2001 and Kent State University in 2002 and 2003. In 2004, Boyer served as the defensive backs coach at Bryant University. He then served as the defensive coordinator at the South Dakota School of Mines and Technology in 2005 before joining the New England Patriots in 2006.

New England Patriots
Boyer joined the Patriots in 2006 as a defensive coaching assistant. He was promoted to defensive backs coach following the 2008 season. In 2012, his title was changed to cornerbacks coach. Boyer won three Super Bowls and six AFC Championships with the Patriots.

Miami Dolphins
In 2019, Boyer left the Patriots with Brian Flores going to the Miami Dolphins becoming the team’s defensive pass game coordinator and cornerbacks coach. In 2020, he was promoted to the post of defensive coordinator. On January 19, 2023, Miami fired him as defensive coordinator.

References

External links
Coaching statistics at Pro-Football-Reference.com

1977 births
Living people
People from Heath, Ohio
Dayton Flyers football coaches
Kent State Golden Flashes football coaches
King's College Monarchs football coaches
National Football League defensive coordinators
New England Patriots coaches
Bryant Bulldogs football coaches
South Dakota Mines Hardrockers football coaches
Muskingum Fighting Muskies football players
Miami Dolphins coaches